Alex Kristian Scally (born July 15, 1982) is an American multi-instrumentalist and songwriter. He is known as the co-writer, guitarist and backing vocalist of the dream pop duo Beach House, with whom he has recorded eight studio albums.

Early life
Scally was born July 15, 1982 in Baltimore, Maryland, where he was raised. He graduated from Baltimore Polytechnic Institute in 2000, and from Oberlin College in 2004, where he studied geology and ran NCAA Division III cross-country. Upon graduation, he returned to Baltimore to work as a carpenter alongside his father.

Career

In 2004, Scally founded Beach House with Victoria Legrand in Baltimore. The two had decided to base their project in Baltimore as it was "a place where people can make music intensely, because you don't have to make much [money] to live [there]." Recalling the formation of the band, Scally said: "We were both just kind of knocking around Baltimore right in our early 20s, and met doing a different musical project, and then [Beach House] kind of grew out of it."

Regarding their early shows, Scally noted: "I'm really glad nobody came to our shows at the start, because we had no idea what we were doing." As of 2022, the group has released a total of eight studio albums.

Discography

References

External links
 Beach House official website

1982 births
American rock guitarists
American male guitarists
American indie rock musicians
Living people
Musicians from Baltimore
Oberlin College alumni
Guitarists from Maryland
21st-century American guitarists
21st-century American male musicians